Sea Level, also spelled Sealevel, is an unincorporated community in northeastern Carteret County, North Carolina, United States. It rests on the banks of the Core Sound and has a population of roughly 450. It is located in what was known to early settlers as Hunting Quarters. Sea Level has one of the lowest elevations in North Carolina; it is estimated that approximately 75% of the community floods when hurricanes pass through. US 70 is the major thoroughfare through the community. The community is the location of NC 12's southern terminus.  The ZIP Code for Sealevel is 28577.

References and external links 
 Sea Level Hurricane Data and History

Specific

Unincorporated communities in Carteret County, North Carolina
Unincorporated communities in North Carolina
Populated coastal places in North Carolina